Group B of the WABA League is due to take place between 11 October 2022 and 28 December 2022. The four best ranked teams will advance to the SuperLeague.

Standings

Fixtures and results
All times given below are in Central European Time.

Game 1

Game 2

Game 3

Game 4

Game 5

Game 6

Game 7

Game 8

Game 9

Game 10

References

External links
Official website

Group B